Henry's Farmers Market (also known as Henry's Marketplace and Henry's) was a grocery retailer that operated in California. In 2011, it started becoming part of the Sprouts Farmers Market chain with a full acquisition taking place by early- to mid-2013.

History

Henry’s Farmers Market was an operator of natural-foods stores that suggest a shopping experience similar to the produce stands and neighborhood butchers of the 1950s. Henry’s stores offered produce, vitamins and supplements, and all-natural foods. The company was established in 1943 when Henry Boney and his family opened a fruit stand on a street corner in San Diego. Henry's first store in Northern California opened in Elk Grove on August 18, 2010.

In December 2010, Henry's announced plans to open its first Boise, Idaho store in the downtown area, in 2011. However, a week after the announcement, plans for the Boise store were stalled.

Acquisitions
The Henry's chain included 23 stores in Southern California and one in Northern California. In 1999, Wild Oats Markets, Inc. acquired Henry's Marketplace from the Henry Boney Family. Following a highly debated merger in August 2007, Wild Oats was acquired by Whole Foods Market.

Soon thereafter, in October 2007, Whole Foods Market sold all 35 Henry's Farmers Market and Sun Harvest Market stores to a subsidiary of Los Angeles grocer Smart & Final, Inc., for $166 million. Earlier in 2007, Smart & Final had been acquired by the private equity firm Apollo Management.

Sprouts, an Arizona-based market, is the second specialty market brand developed by the Henry Boney family. The first store opened in Chandler, Arizona in 2002. In early 2011, Sprouts announced that it would be merging Sprouts and Henry's Farmers Market. The combined company, which operates under the name Sprouts Farmers Market, had 98 stores and more than 7,000 employees at the time the transaction closed in the second quarter of 2011.

References

Defunct supermarkets of the United States
Retail companies established in 1943
Companies based in Phoenix, Arizona
Health food stores
Private equity portfolio companies